Pica d'Estats (or The States Peak) (Catalan: Pica d'Estats, French: Pic d'Estats) is a  mountain in the Montcalm Massif, Pyrenees. on the Spanish–French border, and is the highest mountain in Catalonia.

This mountain is included in the Parc Natural de l'Alt Pirineu.

Summits
The summit is located between the Catalan municipality of Alins in Pallars Sobirà and the French district of Ariège. It comprises three peaks, all lying close to each other:

 Central peak (3,143 m) 
 Western peak, or Pic de Verdaguer, (3,131 m) 
 Eastern peak, or Punta Gabarró, (3,115 m)

This eastern peak is the geodesic vertex. The ridge runs north-northwest to southeast along the Spanish–French border.

See also
List of Pyrenean three-thousanders
Pyrenees 
List of mountains in Catalonia
Extreme points of Catalonia

References

Pyrenean three-thousanders
France–Spain border
International mountains of Europe